Aparejadores Rugby Club is a Spanish rugby team based in Burgos which competes in the División de Honor de Rugby.

History
The club was founded in 2006 after the merging of Burgos Rugby Club and Aparejadores Rugby Club, the team of the Technical Architecture School of the University of Burgos. "Aparejadores" is literally "building engineers" or "technical surveyors". 

In January 2014, the club was promoted for the first time to División de Honor B de Rugby and just four years later won promotion to Spain's top tier.

Season to season

References

External links
Official website

Sport in Burgos
Spanish rugby union teams
Rugby clubs established in 2006
Sports teams in Castile and León